The 2016 William & Mary Tribe football team represented the College of William & Mary as a member of the Colonial Athletic Association (CAA) in the 2016 NCAA Division I FCS football season. The Tribe were led by 37th-year head coach Jimmye Laycock and the team played their home games at Zable Stadium. They finished the season 5–6 overall and 3–5 in CAA play to tie for eighth place.

Schedule

Game summaries

at NC State

at Hampton

Norfolk State

Elon

at New Hampshire

at James Madison

Delaware

Maine

at Stony Brook

at Towson

Richmond

Ranking movements

References

William and Mary Tribe
William & Mary Tribe football seasons
William and Mary Tribe football